The Devil's Brigade is a 1968 American DeLuxe Color war film filmed in Panavision, based on the 1966 book of the same name co-written by American novelist and historian Robert H. Adleman and Col. George Walton, a member of the brigade.

The film recounts the formation, training, and first mission of the 1st Special Service Force, a joint American-Canadian commando unit, known as the Devil's Brigade. The film dramatizes the Brigade's first mission in the Italian Campaign, the task of capturing what is considered an impregnable German mountain stronghold, Monte la Difensa.

Plot
In the summer of 1942, American Lieutenant Colonel Robert T. Frederick, a War Department staff officer with no prior combat or command experience, is summoned to Britain where he is selected by Admiral Lord Louis Mountbatten to raise a commando force composed of both American and Canadian personnel for operations in German-occupied Norway.

Back in the U.S.,  Frederick arrives at the derelict Fort William Henry Harrison in Montana where he receives his American troops — all of whom are jailbirds, ne'er-do-wells, and misfits. When the hand-picked elite Canadian contingent arrives there is immediate friction with the Americans and chaos ensues. By the time Frederick manages to overcome the national differences and mold the First Special Service Force into a highly trained commando unit, he is informed that the Allied High Command have had a change of heart and offered the Norwegian missions to British troops. Left without a role, the brigade is ordered to be disbanded and its soldiers reassigned. Frederick remains undeterred and manages to persuade Lieutenant General Mark Clark to give his men a chance to prove themselves with a new mission in Italy.

Clark's skeptical deputy commander, Major General Maxwell Hunter, orders the 1st Special Service Force to reconnoiter a Wehrmacht garrison in an Italian town, but Frederick goes one better and captures the entire town. In the process, they earn the nickname "Die Teufelsbrigade" — The Devil's Brigade.

Convinced now of the ability of Frederick's men, Lieutenant General Clark promotes Frederick to full Colonel and gives them a task no other Allied troops have managed to accomplish — to capture Monte la Difensa. Facing severe obstacles, the Devil's Brigade attacks the undefended eastern side of the mountain by scaling a cliff the Germans believed could not be climbed. Reaching the top as a unit, they take the stronghold despite considerable losses, allowing the Allies to continue their advance north into Italy.

Cast

 William Holden as Lt. Col./Col. Robert T. Frederick 
 Cliff Robertson as Maj. Alan Crown
 Vince Edwards as Maj. Cliff Bricker 
 Andrew Prine as Pvt. Theodore Ransom
 Jeremy Slate as Sgt. Patrick O'Neill
 Claude Akins as Pvt./Cpl. Rockwell W. "Rocky" Rockman
 Jack Watson as Cpl./Sgt. Peacock
 Richard Jaeckel as Pvt./Cpl. Omar Greco
 Bill Fletcher as Pvt. Billy 'Bronc' Guthrie
 Richard Dawson as Pvt./Cpl. Hugh MacDonald
 Tom Troupe as Pvt. Al Manella
 Luke Askew as Pvt. Hubert Hixon
 Jean-Paul Vignon as Pvt. Henri Laurent
 Tom Stern as Capt. Cardwell, Garrison CO of Fort William Henry Harrison 
 Harry Carey Jr. as Capt. Rose
 Michael Rennie as Lt. Gen. Mark W. Clark, Commander of the U.S. Fifth Army
 Carroll O'Connor as Maj. Gen. Maxwell Hunter
 Dana Andrews as Brig. Gen. Walter Naylor
 Gretchen Wyler as the Lady of Joy
 Patric Knowles as Adm Lord Mountbatten
 Wilhelm Von Homburg as Fritz
 Maggie Thrett as Millie 
 James Craig as Maj. Gen. Knapp
 Richard Simmons as Gen. Bixby
 Norman Alden as the M.P. Lieutenant

Production

Development
The producer David L. Wolper was a noted documentary filmmaker interested in getting into feature films. He purchased the film rights to Adleman and Walton's book in October 1965. (He had already bought the rights to the book The Remagen Bridge.)

Wolper said he was attracted to the material because he did not want to be typed as a serious documentary filmmaker. "It's based on truth but it's a 'movie movie' a fun and games type thing," he said.

United Artists agreed to finance. Wolper hired William Roberts to do a script. The producer later wrote in his memoirs that "this was my first feature but I was not in the slightest bit intimidated."

In October 1966 William Holden agreed to star. The following month Andrew McLaglen agreed to direct. David Niven and Dan Blocker were offered roles in the film. The U.S. Department of Defense and the Canadian Department of National Defence both agreed to assist the film production.

Shooting
Filming started 15 April 1967. The motion picture was filmed with the 19th Special Forces Group at Camp Williams, Utah, 20 miles south of Salt Lake City, with battle locations on Lone Peak near Draper, Utah, and on location in Sant'Elia Fiumerapido, Italy.

Parts of the film were also shot in Park City, Lehi, Alpine, Solitude and Granite Mountain in Utah.

David L. Wolper realized it would be as cheap to shoot in an Italian village as building an Italian set in America. However, the birthday scene which is set in Italy was filmed at the National Guard Armory in Salt Lake City, with Brigham Young University students as extras.

The U.S. National Guard Bureau provided 300 members of the Utah National Guard to portray soldiers in the mass battle scenes filmed. Wolper had the Brigade wear attractive but fictional red berets that appeared as well as on the film's posters and on the tie-in paperback cover of Adelman and Walton's book.

The cast of The Devil's Brigade included NFL running back Paul Hornung and World Middleweight Champion boxer Gene Fullmer in minor roles. They can be seen in the barroom brawl sequence, Hornung as a belligerent lumberjack and Fullmer as the bartender.

Wolper later wrote that Holden was very cooperative during the shoot in Utah, only drinking wine, but in Italy his drinking got out of control. Wolper had to call on the assistance of a woman in Paris who had dealt with Holden before and helped him finish the film on schedule. Filming concluded on July 3, 1967, in London.

Post production
McLaglen said when he showed the finished cut to United Artists they "loved" the film.
But the producer had a big projection room in his house, and he showed the movie for a solid week to a hundred people, and I think a hundred people had ideas of what we should do with the movie... And without me having any input – I didn’t have the last say – they cut the movie and, in the end, it was not nearly as good as it could have been. I had a great ending, and a lot of good stuff in there, and he didn’t know what he was doing. I still worry about that.

Soundtrack
Alex North composed the score of the film, re-purposing the theme from his rejected score to the pilot episode of The Rat Patrol. At the time of release only a cover version of the soundtrack album by Leroy Holmes was released by United Artists Records. The album was illustrated with the original Sandy Kossin artwork of the film and featured instrumental (with whistling) and a male chorus singing lyrics to North's title theme. The album also contained cover versions of other North themes from the film as well as 1940s popular music that appeared in the film.

In 2007 Film Score Monthly and Intrada released a limited CD edition of North's original score with Kossin's artwork including alternate versions of the title theme, North's own arrangements of four 1940s jazz popular tunes, two traditional Christmas carols, and the pipe band version of Scotland the Brave featuring in the film.

Release
The film had its world premiere on May 14, 1968, at the Michigan Theater, Detroit and at the Vanity Theater in Windsor, Ontario in Canada. It opened at an additional 5 theaters in Detroit the following day.

Reception

Box office
The film was the fourth-most-popular movie in general release in Britain in 1968, after The Jungle Book, Barbarella and Carry on Doctor.

Wolper later wrote "The Devil's Brigade turned out to be a terrific film. It was a wonderful story, the acting was excellent, and the preview audiences and critics loved it. Unfortunately it came out just a few months after the release of The Dirty Dozen, which was the same kind of story. It was a big hit and it killed us. We got lost in the wind."

Accuracy
To the veterans of the Force, the film was historically inaccurate. In a TV documentary Suicide Missions: The Black Devils, Force member Bill Story stated: "The Devil's Brigade was and is a very entertaining war movie. But as a piece of accurate history it's sheer nonsense. There was never an aspect of The Dirty Dozen. This was absolutely not true."

See also
 List of American films of 1968

References

Notes

External links 

 
 
 
 

1968 films
1960s action war films
American action war films
1960s English-language films
Films about the United States Army
Canadian Armed Forces in films
Italian Campaign of World War II films
Films set in Montana
Films set in Italy
Films set in 1942
Films set in 1943
Films about Canada–United States relations
Films directed by Andrew McLaglen
Films scored by Alex North
Films shot in Utah
United Artists films
Cultural depictions of Louis Mountbatten, 1st Earl Mountbatten of Burma
Films shot in Lazio
Films set in London
American World War II films
Films shot in London
Films with screenplays by William Roberts (screenwriter)
Films based on non-fiction books
World War II films based on actual events
Films produced by David L. Wolper
1960s American films